The 4th Jharkhand Assembly was constituted after the 2014 Jharkhand Legislative Assembly election

the unicameral state legislature of Jharkhand state in India. The seat of the Vidhan Sabha is at Ranchi, the capital of the state. The Vidhan Sabha comprises 81 Members of Legislative Assembly, directly elected from single-seat constituencies.

Major laws passed

Pathalgadi movement against tribal land law amendments

In 2016–2017, the Raghubar Das government was seeking amendments to the Chhotanagpur Tenancy Act, 1908, and the Santhal Pargana Tenancy Act, 1949. These two original laws had safeguarded the rights of the tribal communities on their land. According to the existing laws the land transactions could only be done between the tribals. The new amendments gave the tribals the right to allow the government to make commercial use of the tribal land and to take the tribal land on lease. The proposed bill amending the existing law had been approved by the Jharkhand Legislative Assembly. The bills were sent to Murmu for approval in November 2016.

The tribal people had strongly objected to the proposed law. During the Pathalgardi rebellion, protests were held against the proposed amendments to the tenancy acts. In one incident the protests turned violent and the tribals abducted the security detail of the BJP MP Karia Munda. Police responded with a violent crackdown on the tribals that caused the death of a tribal man. Criminal cases were filed against more than 200 people including the tribal rights activist Father Stan Swamy. Governor Droupadi Murmu, was criticized for her soft stand on police aggression against tribals during the movement. According to woman tribal rights activist Aloka Kujur she was expected to speak up to the government in support of the tribals but it did not happen, and instead she appealed to the Pathalgarhi agitation leaders to repose faith in the constitution.

Murmu had received total of 192 memorandums against the amendments in the bill. Then opposition leader Hemant Soren had said that the BJP government wanted to acquire tribal land through the two amendment Bills for the benefit of corporates. Opposition parties Jharkhand Mukti Morcha, the Congress, the Jharkhand Vikas Morcha and others had put intense pressure against the bill. On 24 May 2017, Murmu relented and refused to give assent to the bills and returned the bill to the state government along with the memorandums she had received. The bill was later withdrawn in August 2017.

Religion and land bill
In 2017, the ministry approved the Freedom of Religion Bill, 2017, and the bill to amend the Land Acquisition 2013 Act passed by the Jharkhand Assembly.

The new religion bill makes it an offence subject to a penalty of three years in prison, to coerce or lure a person to convert their religion. If the person coerced is a member of a Scheduled Caste or tribe, a minor, or female, the prison term increases to four years. Fines can be levied in any case. The bill also made it mandatory for voluntary converts, to inform the Deputy Commissioner about their conversion, and to give full details about the circumstances.

The amendments in the Land Acquisition Act, 2013, involved changes in the compensation duration and requirements for social impacts assessment. According to the passed law, monetary compensation for government acquisition of tribal land must be paid within six months of acquisition. The requirement for social impact assessments was dropped for some types of infrastucture projects.

Composition 
After the 2014 Jharkhand Legislative Assembly election. 

Composition at the end of the Assembly session

Member of Legislative Assembly

References

4th
2014 establishments in Jharkhand
2014